Poland competed at the 1958 European Athletics Championships in Stockholm, Sweden, from 19-24 August 1958. A delegation of 49 athletes were sent to represent the country.

Medals

References

European Athletics Championships
1958
Nations at the 1958 European Athletics Championships